Angelo Biancini (1911-1988) was an Italian sculptor. Room 10 of the Collection of Modern Religious Art, Vatican Museums is dedicated to Biancini.

References

1911 births
1988 deaths
20th-century Italian sculptors
20th-century Italian male artists